Arsalan Arif (born 5 January 1993 in Mirpur, Azad Kashmir), is a Pakistani cricketer.

Domestic career
Arif made his debut for AJK Jaguars against Islamabad Leopards in the 2014–15 National T20 Cup. He got figures of 2/20 (4 overs), picking up the wickets of Babar Azam and Ali Sarfraz, and scored 9 (7) which led to Islamabad winning by 34 runs. His next match was against Faisalabad Wolves. He didn’t bat and got figures of 0/48 (3 overs). Faisalabad won the match by 8 wickets. His last match of the tournament came against Lahore Eagles. He scored 3 (4) and got figures of 0/19 (2.3 overs). Lahore won the match by 7 wickets. In 2021, Arif was selected by Muzaffarabad Tigers during the 2021 KPL draft in the emerging category. He played in 2 matches, and Muzaffarabad went on to lose the final to Rawalakot Hawks.

References

External links
 
 Arsalan Arif at Pakistan Cricket Board

1993 births
Living people
Pakistani cricketers
People from Azad Kashmir